Martin D. Buth II (October 18, 1917 – July 24, 2017) was an American politician from the state of Michigan. He served in the Michigan House of Representatives from 1959 to 1982.

Early life
Buth was born in Comstock Park, Michigan, and attended school in the same place. He later studied at Michigan State University, focusing on dairy farming.

Career
Buth was elected to the Michigan House of Representatives in 1959. He retired from the House in 1989, and served two terms on the Kent County Board of Commissioners.

Personal life
Buth's son George S. Buth served as a judge on the 17th Circuit Court in Kent County for 30 years.

Buth died on July 24, 2017 at the age of 99.

References

1917 births
2017 deaths
Republican Party members of the Michigan House of Representatives
Michigan State University alumni
20th-century American politicians